Historia Anglorum ("History of the English") is the title of two medieval works on the history of England: 
by Henry of Huntingdon (c. 1154)
by Matthew Paris (c. 1255)